The 1949 New Hampshire Wildcats football team was an American football team that represented the University of New Hampshire as a member of the Yankee Conference during the 1949 college football season. In its first year under head coach Clarence E. "Chief" Boston, the team compiled a 4–4 record (1–3 against conference opponents), scoring and allowing an equal number of points, 153. The team played its home games at Lewis Field (also known as Lewis Stadium) in Durham, New Hampshire.

Schedule

After playing Toledo in three consecutive seasons, 1947 to 1949, the two programs did not meet again until 2011.

References

New Hampshire
New Hampshire Wildcats football seasons
New Hampshire Wildcats football